Tsehay Gemechu (born 12 December 1998) is an Ethiopian long-distance runner. She represented Ethiopia in the women's 5000 metres at the 2019 World Athletics Championships, finishing fourth. Gemechu won the 10,000 metres at the 2019 African Games.

Career
Tsehay Gemechu twice won Delhi Half Marathon (2018, 2019), setting new consecutive course records. She placed second at the Great Ethiopian Run, a 10 km road race in Addis Ababa, in 2018.

In 2019, she won the 10K Valencia Ibercaja, setting a new national record of 30:15 and slicing 15 seconds off Tirunesh Dibaba's previous best. She competed in the senior women's race at the 2019 IAAF World Cross Country Championships held in Aarhus, Denmark in March of that year, finishing in sixth place. In August, Gemechu won the 10,000 metres at the African Games in Rabat, Morocco, and in October, placed fourth in the 5000 metres event of the World Championships held in Doha, Qatar.

The 22-year-old competed in the women's 10,000 metres event at the delayed 2020 Tokyo Olympics in 2021, but was disqualified. After the Games, she won the Copenhagen Half Marathon with a new course record and personal best (1:05:08), and then the Lisbon Half Marathon.

In March 2022, Gemechu placed second at the Istanbul Half Marathon (1:05:52) to take her second successive Lisbon Half Marathon title two months later (1:06:44). In August, she finished second at the Antrim Coast Half Marathon in Northern Ireland, setting new personal best of 1:05:01. She debuted in the marathon in October, placing third at the Amsterdam Marathon with a time of 2:18:59.

Personal bests
 5000 metres – 14:29.60 (Doha 2019)
 10,000 metres – 30:19.29 (Hengelo 2021)
 10 kilometres – 30:15 (Valencia 2019)
 Half marathon – 1:05:01 (Larne 2022)
 Marathon – 2:18:59 (Amsterdam 2022)

References

External links

1998 births
Living people
Ethiopian female cross country runners
Ethiopian female long-distance runners
World Athletics Championships athletes for Ethiopia
Athletes (track and field) at the 2019 African Games
African Games medalists in athletics (track and field)
African Games gold medalists for Ethiopia
African Games gold medalists in athletics (track and field)
Athletes (track and field) at the 2020 Summer Olympics
Olympic athletes of Ethiopia
21st-century Ethiopian women